Ian Arkley is a British heavy metal guitarist and singer. His current band is the UK gothic doom metal outfit My Silent Wake.

Biography 
Arkley first gained attention as a member (and leader) of Christian thrash metal band Seventh Angel. Signed to Under One Flag, Seventh Angel released first album The Torment (1990), followed by Lament for the Weary (1992).

After Seventh Angel split, Arkley formed Ashen Mortality, adopting a doomier style mixed with mediaeval influences and some death vocals. Ashen Mortality self-released two albums, Sleepless Remorse and Your Caress.

Arkley was briefly a member of the Australian doom band Paramaecium and recorded the album A Time to Mourn with them. Ashen Mortality split in the autumn of 2004, playing their last gig on Halloween of that year. With two of the members in the final line-up of Ashen Mortality, Arkley formed My Silent Wake. My Silent Wake recorded a two-song demo in mid-2005, and the limited 100 copy run sold out almost immediately, and resulted in a record deal with indie label Bombworks Records. My Silent Wake released their first full-length album Shadow of Sorrow on Bombworks Records in spring 2006. Drawing on similar influences to Ashen Mortality, My Silent Wake is a more experimental progression for Arkley, with more open soundscape arrangements, but also a heavier aspect to the sound. My Silent Wake went on to record a further three albums and a split album with The Drowning. The band are still active.

Arkley recorded two albums with the space rock band The Other Window.

Arkley is also involved in a collaboration with the Visionaire frontman in a band called Century Sleeper who released Awaken in 2006.

Seventh Angel later reformed in 2008, and released the album "The Dust of Years" in 2009, which saw the band take a more Death/Doom approach to their previous style.

Since 2010 Arkley has also been involved with the industrial/darkwave band Attrition, contributing guitar. During this time, Arkley has also been active with My Silent Wake.

References

English Christians
English heavy metal guitarists
Living people
British performers of Christian music
Christian metal musicians
Paramaecium members
Year of birth missing (living people)